Wurster's blue is the trivial name given to the chemical N,N,N′,N′-tetramethyl-p-phenylenediamine, also known as TMPD. It is an easily oxidised phenylenediamine, which loses two electrons in one-electron oxidation steps; the radical cation is a characteristic blue-violet colour, which gives the compound part of its name. The remaining part of its name comes from its discoverer, the German chemist Casimir Wurster (7 August 1854 – 29 November 1913).

The hydrochloride salt finds use as a redox indicator in the oxidase test and is also used in electron transport chain analysis as it is capable of donating electrons to cytochrome c.

The term "Wurster's blue" is often reserved for the radical cation, the colorless diamine being called tetramethylphenylenediamine (TMPD). The midpoint potential for titration of the first electron is given as 0.276 V vs NHE, and this transition is useful in potentiometric titrations as both a redox mediator and indicator. The two electron-oxidized form (di-iminium) is unstable in aqueous solutions, therefore highly oxidizing conditions should be avoided in titrations relying on TMPD, or reached only during the final stage of the titration. The second oxidation step is not well separated from the first on the redox scale, so some instability will be encountered on the oxidizing side of 0.276, and it is impossible to prepare pure aqueous solutions of Wurster's Blue due to its dismutation to the unstable diaminium and TMPD.

References

Wurster's original paper (in German)

Anilines
Diamines
Redox indicators